Club Deportivo Avispones de Chilpancingo Asociación Civil is a football club that plays in the  Liga Premier - Serie B. It is based in the city of Chilpancingo, Mexico.

History
The team was founded in 1988 as a representative team from Acapulco, later it became the property of the Government of Guerrero, which decided to move the team to Chilpancingo, the state capital. Since its foundation, the team has played in the Third Division. In 2013 the team reached the round of 16 of the tournament, being their best recent participation.

On September 26, 2014 the team played a game as a visitor in the city of Iguala, Guerrero, after finishing the match, the team was returning to their city when it was attacked in a shootout related to the 2014 Iguala mass kidnapping, the player David Josué García Evangelista was killed on the spot, while twelve other members of the team and coaching staff were injured. In November 2014 the team returned to play matches after a month without activity.

In 2019, the team entered an economic crisis after the assassination of its president, so the Chilpancingo City Council and the Government of Guerrero intervened in the club to ensure its continuity.

In the 2021–22 season the team was promoted to the Liga Premier de México – Serie B after defeating Real Ánimas de Sayula in the promotion playoff. The team had previously achieved the regional Liga TDP sub-championship where it was defeated by Deportiva Venados.

Stadium
The team plays its home games at the Polideportivo Chilpancingo, the soccer field is known as Estadio David Josué García Evangelista in tribute to the team player killed in Iguala on September 26, 2014. It has a capacity to hold 5,000 spectators.

Rivalry
C.D. Avispones de Chilpancingo has an important rivalry with the Águilas UAGro, team representative of the state's public university, the match is known as the Clásico Guerrerense.

Players

First-team squad

See also
Football in Mexico
Tercera División de México

References

External links
Liga TDP
Liga MX

Association football clubs established in 1988
Football clubs in Guerrero
1988 establishments in Mexico
Chilpancingo